Zora Palová (born 1947) is a Slovak glass artist.

Biography 
Palová was born in Bratislava, Slovakia and attended the applied arts school there. She later became a teacher at the public art school in Nitra, and worked as a designer, before returning to her hometown and resuming studies in art. She initially studied painting and sculpture, but changed her major to study architecture and glass.

From 1996 to 2003 she was head of the glass department at the University of Sunderland in England. In 2008, she received the Rakow Commission from Corning Museum of Glass, New York.

References

1947 births
Living people
20th-century women artists
21st-century women artists
Women glass artists
Glass artists
Slovak women artists
Artists from Bratislava
Academics of the University of Sunderland